Cee-Lo Green... Is the Soul Machine is the second studio album by Cee Lo Green, released on March 2, 2004.

Legacy
The album was included in the book 1001 Albums You Must Hear Before You Die.

Singles 
 "I'll Be Around" (#52) (Hot R&B/Hip-Hop Songs)
 "The One" (#82) (Hot R&B/Hip-Hop Songs)

Track listing 
Credits adapted from the album's liner notes.

Sample credits
 "The Art of Noise" contains replayed elements from "These Eyes", written by Burton Cummings and Randy Bachman.
 "The One" contains samples from:
 "Devotion", written by Philip Bailey and Maurice White, and performed by Earth, Wind & Fire.
 "Public Enemy No. 1", written by Carlton Ridenhour and Hank Shocklee, and performed by Public Enemy.
 "My Kind of People" contains re-sung elements from "Pass the Dutchie", written by Donat Mittoo, Headley Bennett, Lloyd Ferguson, Leroy Sibbles, Robert Lyn, Huford Brown, and Fitzroy Simpson.
 "Evening News" contains samples from "Return from the Ashes (Theme)", written and performed by John Dankworth.
 "Glockapella" contains samples from "Holy Ghost", written by James Banks, Eddie Marion, and Henderson Thigpen, and performed by The Bar-Kays.

Charts

Weekly charts

Year-end charts

References 

2004 albums
CeeLo Green albums
Albums produced by Timbaland
Albums produced by the Neptunes
Albums produced by Jazze Pha
Albums produced by DJ Premier
Albums produced by Organized Noize